The Ceratobatrachidae are a family of frogs found in the Malay Peninsula, Borneo, the Philippines, Palau, Fiji, New Guinea, and the Admiralty, Bismarck, and Solomon Islands.

Taxonomy
Ceratobatrachidae was formerly treated as a subfamily (i.e., Ceratobatrachinae) in the family Ranidae (true frogs), but have now been re-classified as a separate family. The following genera are recognised:
 Subfamily Alcalinae Brown, Siler, Richards, Diesmos, and Cannatella, 2015 
 Alcalus (5 species)
 Subfamily Ceratobatrachinae Boulenger, 1884
Cornufer Tschudi, 1838 (> 50 species)
Platymantis Günther, 1858 (> 30 species)
 Subfamily Liuraninae Fei, Ye, and Jiang, 2010
Liurana Dubois, 1987 (4 species)

Formerly, the following genera were also recognized in the family Ceratobatrachidae, but have now been merged into the genera above.
Batrachylodes Boulenger, 1887 (8 species)
Palmatorappia Ahl, 1927 (1 species)
Ceratobatrachus Boulenger, 1884 (1 species)
Discodeles Boulenger, 1918 (5 species)

Distribution
Ceratobatrachidae is distributed across Island Southeast Asia, as well as in the Eastern Himalayas.
Genus Liurana
Eastern Himalayas: 4 species
Genus Alcalus
Borneo: 2 species (Alcalus baluensis and Alcalus rajae)
Palawan: 1 species (Alcalus mariae)
Genus Platymantis
Philippines: 
Genus Cornufer
Palau: 1 species
Maluku: 3-4 species
New Guinea: 6-8 species
Bismarck Archipelago: 18-22 species
Solomon Islands: 20-25 species
Fiji: 2 species

Life history
All Ceratobatrachidae lay eggs outside of water and undergo direct development where eggs hatch directly into froglets, without free-living tadpole stages.

References

 
Amphibian families
Taxa named by George Albert Boulenger